National Route A005 is an -long two-lane highway connecting National Route 8 and 
National Route 36 in the city of Río Cuarto, Córdoba Province, Argentina.

Administration
In 1990, the Federal Government opened bids for concessions to maintain the busiest routes, dividing the different areas in Corredores Viales (road corridors). This route, part of Corredor Vial 20 was given to the Red Vial Centro company

In 2003, concession contracts were renegotiated and the route changed to Corredor Vial 4, and management was given to Caminos de América.

References

National roads in Córdoba Province, Argentina
Tourism in Argentina